Walter West may refer to:

 Walter West (director) (1885–1958), British film director
 Walter J. West (1917–1984), American football player and coach
 Walter Scott West (1872–1943), American soldier
 Walter West (politician) (1861–1934), Australian politician
 Walter West (wrestler), British competitor at the 1908 Summer Olympics
 W. Richard West Sr. (1912–1996), Southern Cheyenne painter, sculptor, and educator from Oklahoma
 Walter West (comics), an alternate reality version of the superhero The Flash
 Walter T. West (1845–?), American politician in the Oregon House of Representatives

See also
Wally West (disambiguation)